Hirwaun was a railway station serving the village of Hirwaun in Rhondda Cynon Taf, Wales.

History
The station was opened by the Vale of Neath Railway in 1851, although tramways and railways had existed in the area for at least 60+ years due to the Hirwaun Ironworks and other industries.

Operations
Although only a relatively small station serving an industrial community, Hirwaun was an important junction station for the VoNR. At Gelli Tarw Junction just north of the station, it merged three lines:
Mainline from Neath to Merthyr
Branch to Aberdare, later junctioning with the Aberdare Railway
Dare Valley branch, initially to Bwllfa Colliery and then extended

The three platforms of the station were also supplemented by a brickworks just north of the station site. South of the station, there existed the goods yard and associated sidings, plus junctions for:
The Hirwaun Ironworks railway
Tower Colliery
Penderyn quarry tramway
Tir Herbert brickworks
Hirwaun Common railway

Between  and Hirwaun, a distance of only , there were: five collieries; two quarries; and one gunpowder/silica factory. During World War II, the Royal Ordnance Factory ROF Hirwaun added to both the goods and passenger traffic load.

In 1956, the station was used by Queen Elizabeth II during her visit to the village.

Closure
Taken over by the Great Western Railway on grouping in 1923, it fell victim to the Beeching Axe in 1964, with the last train running on 13 June.

Current

There was a dedicated rail link bus that linked  with the community. It was only available to rail passengers, and operated to Penywaun, Hirwaun, Cefn Rhigos and Rhigos.

Although Tower's underground workings final ceased on 18 January 2008, DB Cargo UK continued to run trains to the Tower washery, which depart Aberdare at 7 pm on Wednesdays, and 1130 on the Thursdays, Fridays and Saturdays, most often hauled by a Class 66. This service was later taken over by Freightliner, but this service varied in schedule, again hauled by a Class 66.
These services came to an end in 2017, due a reduced demand for coal, following a tightening of environmental regulations.

Reopening

In November 2009 the Welsh Government asked Network Rail to conduct a feasibility study on reopening the line to Hirwaun for passenger services.

It was announced in March 2011 that the Welsh Government's 2011-12 capital investment programme would include the re-opening of the line to Hirwaun as part of the Cynon Valley Scheme although the project appears to have advanced little at that time. In 2019–2020, Cardiff Capital Region City Deal's Transport Authority secured £100,000 of funding from the Welsh Government's Local Transport Fund to undertake Welsh Transport Appraisal Guidance (WelTAG) 1 study into the feasibility of extending Aberdare Line passenger services through a reopened Hirwaun station to a new terminus serving the Tower strategic development site.

The line to this station has been identified by Campaign for a Better Transport as a priority 1 candidate for reopening.

A further extension of the line is also being considered to Cwmgwrach and onto Neath is also being considered, as part of the consultation for the Swansea Bay Metro Scheme.

Notes

References
 Body, G. (1983), PSL Field Guides - Railways of the Western Region, Patrick Stephens Ltd, Wellingborough, 
 Page, J. (1988), forgotten Railways: Volume 8 - South Wales (2nd Ed), David & Charles Publishers, Newton Abbott, 

Disused railway stations in Rhondda Cynon Taf
Railway stations in Great Britain opened in 1851
Railway stations in Great Britain closed in 1964
Former Great Western Railway stations
1851 establishments in Wales